The Stench of Redemption is the eighth studio album by American death metal band Deicide. It is the first album by the band to feature Jack Owen (formerly of Cannibal Corpse) and Ralph Santolla (formerly of Iced Earth) on guitars. Some editions of the album include a cover of "Black Night" by Deep Purple, with rewritten lyrics by Glen Benton.

The Stench of Redemption was Deicide's most successful release to date, peaking at No. 11 on the Top Heatseekers chart. Many critics praised The Stench of Redemption as a return to form for Deicide, despite the band losing both Eric and Brian Hoffman.

Background
Two tracks, "Homage for Satan" and "Crucified for Innocence", were released exclusively via iTunes on June 6, 2006. Deicide released these songs online because of financial problems that the band and Earache Records had. The band also cancelled some of their concerts because of these financial problems.

The album features themes of destruction and anti-Christianity. This is the first Deicide album to have writing credits attributed to individual band members.

There is a noticeable change in the guitar work, as guitar leads are much more prevalent. The style of the solos on the album is also drastically different from previous Deicide records. Ralph Santolla and Jack Owen utilize a neo-classical style of guitar soloing along with the traditional riffing of Deicide.

Drummer Steve Asheim said of the album, "I'd have to say Stench is definitely my favorite and the one I'm most proud of, Benton too I think. It really all came together on this one, the material, the players, the sound, the vibe... It was a real pleasure doing this record with this line-up, almost effortless."

Reviews 

The Stench of Redemption met with positive reviews, with most reviewers praising the added melodic dimension, which they attribute to the new guitarists.  Chad Bowar, writing for About.com, praised the guitar team for "breath[ing] new life into Deicide's approach. You might not even notice because of all the blast beats and breakneck riffing, but there are some actual melodies here. They have added a subtle layer of complexity to the band's brutal arsenal, which makes the songs that much more powerful".  Similarly, Scott Alisoglu wrote for Blabbermouth that the new guitarists "add to Deicide's legendary death metal sound by upping the six-string dynamics and giving these compositions a much-needed injection of compositional depth. That does not mean that you won't recognize The Stench of Redemption as anything but a Hell-fried Deicide album, only that the added ingredients push the album to heights previously unattained".  Jackie Smit, writing for Chronicles of Chaos, claimed that the addition of Jack Owen and Ralph Santolla not only "lit under the remaining original members' collective behinds", but also added a melodic dimension "unlike anything the Hoffman brothers were ever able to muster".  Referring to the album as "unapologetically melodic", Cosmo Lee wrote in Stylus Magazine that The Stench of Redemption is "no less brutal" as a result of the melodic inclinations, and praised Steve Asheim's "massive, memorable" riffs and Benton's "diabolical" vocals.

Track listing

Personnel
Glen Benton – bass, vocals, executive production
Steve Asheim – drums
Jack Owen – guitars 
Ralph Santolla – guitars

Accolades
The Turkish Metal Music Awards of 2006, conducted by Turkish webzine Bira Darkzine, has recognized The Stench of Redemption as the best metal album of 2006, as voted by the Turkish public.

References 

Deicide (band) albums
2006 albums
Earache Records albums